Troy Kemp (born June 18, 1966) is a former high jumper from the Bahamas who won the gold medal at the 1995 World Championships in Athletics. His personal best was 2.38m in Nice 1995.

He Attended Boise State University where he was an All-American. He was inducted into the Boise State Hall of Fame in 1996.

International competitions

References

Sporting-Heroes profile
Troy Kemp. Sports Reference. Retrieved on 2015-01-18.

1966 births
Living people
Sportspeople from Nassau, Bahamas
Bahamian male high jumpers
Olympic male high jumpers
Olympic athletes of the Bahamas
Athletes (track and field) at the 1988 Summer Olympics
Athletes (track and field) at the 1992 Summer Olympics
Athletes (track and field) at the 1996 Summer Olympics
Pan American Games silver medalists for the Bahamas
Pan American Games medalists in athletics (track and field)
Athletes (track and field) at the 1987 Pan American Games
Athletes (track and field) at the 1991 Pan American Games
Competitors at the 1998 Goodwill Games
World Athletics Championships athletes for the Bahamas
World Athletics Championships medalists
World Athletics Championships winners
Japan Championships in Athletics winners
Medalists at the 1987 Pan American Games
Medalists at the 1991 Pan American Games